Armand Benneker (born 25 June 1969) is a Dutch former professional footballer who played as a defender. He is a first team scout for English club Manchester United. As a player, he appeared for MVV Maastricht in the Netherlands, Dundee United in Scotland and several Austrian clubs, including Austria Lustenau.

Playing career
Benneker was born in Tongeren, Belgium, and began his career with Dutch side MVV, before leaving in 1996 to join Scottish side Dundee United. Benneker only played seven league matches for United in the 1996–97 season and was released in 1997, where he moved to Austria Lustenau to play alongside compatriot Erik Regtop. Further spells in Austria ensued with Bregenz, also with Regtop, another with Austria Lustenau and his final playing days at Rheindorf Altach, where he retired in 2004.

Coaching and scouting career
After retiring as a player, Benneker worked as a coach with Austrian clubs RW Rankweil and Dornbirn and the Swiss FC St. Gallen under-18 teams. He lives in the Austrian town Lustenau near the Swiss border.

In October 2016, Benneker joined Premier League club Manchester United as a first team scout, as part of an overhaul of their scouting network.

References

External links
 

1969 births
Living people
People from Tongeren
Association football central defenders
Dutch footballers
MVV Maastricht players
Dundee United F.C. players
SC Austria Lustenau players
SW Bregenz players
SC Rheindorf Altach players
Eredivisie players
Austrian Football Bundesliga players
Scottish Football League players
Dutch expatriate footballers
Expatriate footballers in Scotland
Expatriate footballers in Austria
Dutch expatriate sportspeople in Scotland
Dutch expatriate sportspeople in Austria
Manchester United F.C. non-playing staff